Absent is a 2011 Spanish-language drama film directed by  Argentine director Marco Berger. The film tackles the notion of sexual abuse of students, but director Marco Berger flips the dynamic. In this film, a young man wants to lure his teacher into a sexual relationship, rather than the other way round (i.e. where an older individual in a position of authority or trust becomes infatuated with a minor and lures the minor into a sexual relationship).

Synopsis
The story is told by Sebastián (Carlos Echevarría), the sports coach who becomes the object of a student's affection.  Martín (Javier De Pietro) is a 16-year-old student who is attracted to his coach, Sebastián.  Sebastián tries to keep Martín at a distance, but at the same time tries to be kind and nurturing. Martín goes to great lengths in his attempt to get close to his teacher. When Martín hurts his eye during his swimming class, Sebastián initially takes him to the hospital. After treatment, Sebastián offers Martín a ride home. However, Martín was supposed to spend the night at a friend's house, so no one is expecting him to come home that night.  Martín spends the night at Sebastián's house.  Things come to a head when Sebastián realizes that he was being lied to and punches Martín in the face. He is not angry from disgust for being the object of Martín's desire, rather because Martín's dishonesty could potentially cost the coach his job. Offended, Martín taunts Sebastián, telling him to call the police and suggesting it would cause greater problems for Sebastián. Later, Martín accidentally falls off a roof after retrieving a neighbor's soccer ball, and Sebastián finds himself filled with remorse.

Style
The director is vague on certain plot points. In the last images, for example, there is a shot of Sebastián gently kissing  Martín on the lips. It is not clear whether this actually happened or only occurred in Sebastián's imagination. It is also unclear whether  Martín accidentally fell to his death, or whether it was suicide, driven by Sebastián's rejection. The viewer is kept contemplating if a romantic relationship had occurred, and if it did, if it is immoral in itself regardless of consent.

Reception
When the film won the "Teddy Award for Best Feature" by the Teddy Award Independent Jury at the Berlin International Film Festival (Berlinale), the judging committee praised it as a film with "an original screenplay, an innovative aesthetic and a sophisticated approach, which creates dynamism. A unique combination of homoerotic desire, suspense and dramatic tension."

During the Berlinale, The Hollywood Reporter published a review stating: "Despite its original twist on the tired pedophilia topic, Absent skirts the fringes of dull and would be commercially dismissable, were it not for the edgy mixing job and hyped-up soundtrack that together create a sense of artificial excitement. (...) The small cast is well-chosen and de Pietro, in his first film role, is a real discovery who opens up his character of Martin in ever surprising ways."

Cast
Carlos Echevarría as Sebastián
Javier De Pietro as Martín
Antonella Costa as Mariana
Rocío Pavón as Analía
Alejandro Barbero as Juan Pablo

Awards and nominations
2011: The film won the Teddy Awards for "Best feature film" at the Berlin International Film Festival
2011: The actor Javier De Pietro was nominated for "Best New Actor" for his role Martín in the film during the Argentine Academy of Cinematography Arts and Sciences Awards

See also
Hawaii (2013 film)
Plan B (2009 film)

References

External links
 

2011 films
2010s Spanish-language films
2011 thriller drama films
Argentine LGBT-related films
LGBT-related sports drama films
Films directed by Marco Berger
2011 LGBT-related films
Gay-related films
2011 drama films
2010s Argentine films
Argentine thriller drama films
Argentine sports drama films